Ubik is a 1998 video game by Cryo Interactive, based on the novel Ubik by Philip K. Dick.

Plot
In the year 2019, Joe Chip is working for Runciter Associates in Los Angeles, where he is tasked with preventing enemy companies from spying on his clients.

Gameplay
The player has to lead, train and equip a team of five combatants (including Joe Chip) and complete missions in 3D-rendered maps. Though the backgrounds are prerendered, players can choose from a limited number of different camera angles for each scene. Shooting is a key aspect of the gameplay. The missions include killing all enemies, rescuing hostages and stealing corporate secrets.

Production
The developers thought long and hard about how to translate Dick's work into a video game. Fans of the time associated him with the world of the Blade Runner movie, so the team felt compelled to stick to this. However, they wanted to avoid a wholly science fiction route and instead stay somewhat true to the book. They thought that Dick's 1960s description of the future was more in the tone of Starsky & Hutch, whereas they wanted to update this with a Blade Runner or Total Recall dark cynicism. The PlayStation conversion was difficult due to the hardware not supporting z-buffering.

Critical reception
John Saavedra of Den Of Geek thought the convoluted plot wasn't suitable for a strategy game. Brutoom of Hardcore Gaming 101 thought that the game merged different genres together, and pushed creative boundaries.

References

External links

1998 video games
Cryo Interactive games
PlayStation (console) games
Strategy video games
Video games developed in France
Windows games
Adaptations of works by Philip K. Dick
Video games set in Los Angeles
Video games set in 2019
Video games set in the future